Nanjing Sport Institute is a public university located in Nanjing, Jiangsu, China, specializing in sports and physical education. It was founded in 1956.

Alumni who have won Olympic golds
Luan Jujie, Lin Li, Ge Fei, Gu Jun, Zhang Jun, Huang Xu, Li Ju, Yan Sen, Chen Qi, Chen Ruolin, Zhong Man, Lu Chunlong, Luo Xiaojuan, Xu Anqi, Cai Yun

References

External links
Official site: 

Universities and colleges in Nanjing
Educational institutions established in 1956
1956 establishments in China
Sports universities and colleges in China